New Jersey's 36th Legislative District is one of 40 districts that make up the map for the New Jersey Legislature. It encompasses the Bergen County municipalities of Carlstadt, Cliffside Park, East Rutherford, Little Ferry, Lyndhurst, Moonachie, North Arlington, Ridgefield, Ridgefield Park, Rutherford, South Hackensack, Teterboro, Wallington, and Wood-Ridge and the city of Passaic in Passaic County.

Demographic information
As of the 2020 United States census, the district had a population of 234,046, of whom 182,166 (77.8%) were of voting age. The racial makeup of the district was 106,691 (45.6%) White, 11,210 (4.8%) African American, 3,203 (1.4%) Native American, 24,777 (10.6%) Asian, 91 (0.0%) Pacific Islander, 56,173 (24.0%) from some other race, and 31,901 (13.6%) from two or more races. Hispanic or Latino of any race were 98,871 (42.2%) of the population.

The district had 138,977 registered voters , of whom 55,285 (39.8%) were registered as unaffiliated, 56,454 (40.6%) were registered as Democrats, 25,286 (18.2%) were registered as Republicans, and 1,952 (1.4%) were registered to other parties.

Political representation
For the 2022–2023 session, the district is represented in the State Senate by Paul Sarlo (D, Wood-Ridge) and in the General Assembly by Clinton Calabrese (D, Cliffside Park) and Gary Schaer (D, Passaic).

The legislative district is located within New Jersey's 5th and 9th congressional districts.

Apportionment history
When the 40-district legislative map was created in 1973, the 36th District consisted of southern Bergen County starting at the south end in North Arlington then north along the Passaic River to Garfield and a spur to Bogota via Carlstadt, Moonachie, Ridgefield, Fairview, Palisades Park, and Ridgefield Park. In the 1981 redistricting, the city of Passaic joined the district as did Wood-Ridge, Teterboro, and South Hackensack; Fairview, Palisades Park, Ridgefield Park, and Bogota were moved to other districts during this time. The Bergen County portion of the district was shrunken in the 1991 redistricting leaving only municipalities south of Wallington and Carlstadt in the district; in addition to Passaic remaining, Essex County's Nutley and Belleville were added to the district. Garfield, Wood-Ridge, and Moonachie were reintroduced to the district in the 2001 redistricting though Belleville was moved to the 28th District at this point.

In December 2017, Marlene Caride was nominated by incoming Governor Phil Murphy to head the New Jersey Department of Banking and Insurance, a cabinet-level position; she resigned January 16, 2018, to take the position on an acting basis and was confirmed to the post on June 7. Democratic committee members in Bergen and Passaic Counties unanimously selected Clinton Calabrese as her replacement; he was sworn in on February 8.

Election history

Election results

Senate

General Assembly

References

Bergen County, New Jersey
Passaic County, New Jersey
36